Duo is a Canadian romantic comedy film, directed by Richard Ciupka and released in 2006. The film stars Anick Lemay as Pascale Lachance, a musical agent who is blindsided when her fiancé and star client Lewis Carl (Tim Rozon) betrays her. Setting on the idea of luring legendary singer-songwriter Francis Roy (Serge Postigo) out of retirement, she discovers that rival agent Jules Simard (François Massicotte) has the same idea, only for the two rivals to fall in love with each other as they compete for Roy's contract.

The cast also includes Gildor Roy, Julie McClemens, Sandrine Bisson, Amélie Grenier and Mario Morin. The film's soundtrack includes several songs by Quebec rock singer Stefie Shock.

The film opened in theatres on July 16, 2006. The film was not favourably received by film critics or audiences.

Arthur Tarnowski received a Jutra Award nomination for Best Editing at the 9th Jutra Awards in 2007.

References

External links

2006 films
Canadian romantic comedy films
2006 comedy films
Films directed by Richard Ciupka
French-language Canadian films
2000s Canadian films